Alialujah Choir (-lee--loo- kwy-ər) is an American folk band based in Portland, Oregon.  The band consists of Adam Shearer, Alia Farah (Weinland) and Adam Selzer (Norfolk & Western). The trio is known for their sparse instrumentation, three part harmonies and balanced vocals.    The band's inception is tied to the 19th century humanitarian James C. Hawthorne.

Origin
In 2008 Adam Shearer was approached by Kate Sokoloff (Live Wire! Radio/OPB) to contribute a song for a benefit album titled Dearly Departed.  Along with Al James, Storm Large, Jesse Emerson, Matt Sheehy, Richie Young and other Pacific Northwest singer songwriters, Adam Shearer was asked to compose a song about someone buried at Lone Fir, Portland Oregon's oldest cemetery. Shearer chose to write about James C. Hawthorne, a humanitarian and physician who founded the original Oregon Hospital for the Insane. During the song writing process Shearer collaborated with Adam Selzer on the arrangement. After completing A House, A Home, Shearer and Selzer were inspired to continue writing and recording. Recognizing that piano and a third voice would benefit the music they invited Alia Farah to join them. Receiving the invitation in a 1 am text message Farah responded in jest that she would join Shearer and Selzer if they named the band Alialujah Choir.

Newspaper and magazine articles about the band have noted that in the beginning Alialujah Choir acted as a means for Shearer, Selzer and Farah to escape the commercial pressures of their other bands and return to their love for roots folk music. 
Prior to becoming a band, Shearer, Selzer and Farah drafted a set of rules in an effort to protect their songwriting and recording process from being compromised by extraneous variables connected to the music industry. Music editors have cited that the rules Alialujah Choir put in place for themselves has influenced their music in a positive way.

Debut album
Alialujah Choir's self-titled debut,  was recorded over the course of two years at Type Foundry Studio in Portland, Oregon, and was released by Jealous Butcher Records in February 2012. Shearer, Selzer and Farah recorded the album with self-imposed restrictions.

To begin, no one else could play on the album, or even be present in the studio while the tape was rolling. "We both learned how to run the boards and set up the mics so that Adam [Selzer, who helms Type Foundry Studio, where the group's self-titled debut was recorded] could record his parts," says Farah. Also, there would be no drum kit or bass found in the live room; all percussion had to be relegated to auxiliary status. "We were good about sticking to our many limitations," says Shearer. "And we knew it was because we wanted to preserve the good thing that we had."

In support of their album, after playing a CD release show at the Doug Fir in March 2012,  Alialujah Choir toured with Pokey LaFarge and later with Portland Cello Project.  Alialujah Choir's debut received positive reviews from The Oregonian, NPR, Willamette Week and other established publications. Many of the reviews focused on the chemistry between the band members noting the unity of the group and parallel vocals. In their review of the album The Portland Mercury noted the band's chemistry and sound as,  "The musical connection that permeates the trio is something that exists far beyond anyone's command...every third line finds Shearer, Selzer, and Farah singing together in bone-chilling, otherworldly attunement."

Along with being responsible for Alialujah Choir's formation, the song A House, A Home influenced the completion of their first album. In 2010 Adam Shearer shared the masters of Alialujah Choir's recordings with filmmaker Mark Smith. The Oregonian and other reviews state that Smith became enamored with A House, A Home and decided to create a video that would begin at the last lines of the song.  The anticipated release of the video became a caytalst for the band to complete their debut album. The song A House, A Home also appeared in the final 2012 episode of the television show  Being Human

A House, a Home (film)

A House, a Home is a 2012 American short film/narrative music video scored by Alialujah Choir and features Portland Cello Project. Based on the song of the same name by Adam Shearer and Adam Selzer, the film adaptation was produced by Mark Smith, directed by Daniel Fickle and written by Daniel Fickle and Mark Smith. Starring Meredith Adelaide and Calvin Morie McCarthy the film begins at the last lines of the song A House, A Home: You die knowing he'll bury you / Next to your love in the ground... and tells a story of how a love, a death and another death are reconciled in a subterranean world.

In addition to being an official selection at the Raindance, Fantastic Fest and Mill Valley film festivals, A House, A Home was nominated for numerous awards ultimately winning thirty-two accolades including Best Short Film at the 32nd New Jersey Film Festival and Best of Festival at the 55th Rochester International Film Festival.  A House, A Home was selected as an Official Honoree in The 17th Annual Webby Awards in the Music category.

Awards

Nominations and official selections

Additional appearances
 MTV Canada 
 NME 
 Current TV
 First Post
 IndieWire
 VH1
 Country Music Television

Discography
 Alialujah Choir (LP, Jealous Butcher Records)

References

External links
 Alialujah Choir
 

2012 establishments in Oregon
Musical groups established in 2012
Musical groups from Portland, Oregon